The Sinaia Agreement was concluded on 18 August 1938 between Romania, France and the United Kingdom. It entered into force on 13 May 1939.

The agreement provided for most of the powers of the European Danube Commission, including the control of the Danube maritime navigation from Brăila to the Black Sea, to be transferred to the Romanian state. All of the ships of the Commission became the Romanian state's property.

On 16 May 1939, three days after the treaty went into effect and ended the Commission's authority over the Lower Danube, the Commission's flag was hauled down at Sulina and the Romanian flag was hoisted in its place. On 25 May, the Romanian flag was hoisted aboard a vessel of the Commission, marking the end of a system which had lasted for 82 years, since 1856. The Commission continued to nominally exist, but only as a counselor.

References 

Treaties of the Kingdom of Romania
Treaties of the French Third Republic
Treaties of the United Kingdom
Treaties concluded in 1938
France–Romania relations
Romania–United Kingdom relations
Greater Romania
1938 in Romania
Interwar-period treaties